Lehlohonolo Majoro (born 19 August 1986 in Ladybrand) is a South African footballer who plays as a forward for Premier Soccer League side AmaZulu and the South African national team.

Club career

Kaizer Chiefs
He made his unofficial debut in a Vodacom Challenge in a 1–0 win over Tottenham Hotspur. He was criticised for beating the defence including Gareth Bale but failed to convert. He made his league debut for Chiefs on 18 August 2011 in a 2–1 win over Jomo Cosmos. He also scored on debut only after 2 minutes after an accurate pass from Bernard Parker. He went on to be the club's top goalscorer with 10 goals.

International career
He made his debut for South Africa on 14 May 2011 versus Tanzania in an international friendly.

International goals
Scores and results list South Africa's goal tally first.

References

External links

1986 births
Living people
People from Ladybrand
South African Sotho people
South African soccer players
Association football forwards
AmaZulu F.C. players
Kaizer Chiefs F.C. players
Orlando Pirates F.C. players
Cape Town City F.C. (2016) players
Bidvest Wits F.C. players
South African Premier Division players
South Africa international soccer players
2013 Africa Cup of Nations players
Soccer players from the Free State (province)